= Kumutrampatti =

Kumutrampatti is a small village near Kottampatti (Gateway to Madurai District) in Tamil Nadu. Total Population is about 300. Literacy rate is nearly 75%.
